Wag was a Japanese rock band under the Giza Studio label, active from 1998 to 2006.

Members
Members consisted of siblings, cousins and their childhood friends.
Shinya Hirayama (平山進也) - vocalist (born 31 January 1979)
Yuuji Hirayama (平山裕司) - side guitarist (born 18 October 1980)
Keisuke Yanagida (柳田圭祐) - leader guitarist (born 16 March 1981)
Tetsuya Oguro (小黒哲也) - drummer  (born 29 November 1978)
Kousuke Minami (南公祐) - bassist and member of band until 2004 (born 21 May 1977)

Biography

1998-2001
The formation of the band began in autumn 1998 by the Hirayama siblings, later other members joined the band.

In July 1999, under Giza Studio label they released their first single Odyssey. The single was used as an image song for Sanyo's radio recorder U4.

On 3 September 1999, the first mini album Waggish Tricks was released which includes previously released single Odyssey. Minami Kousuke wrote all the lyrics in English for their indie releases.

On 13 September 1999, they launched their fanclub Wag-On with a monthly fanclub magazine Go For it!

On 2 October 1999, they started broadcasting their own radio program Future Paradise Wag-On on Kiss-Fm radio station. On their official site under section Radio section they shared for listeners the complete radio talk and list of power-played songs. The final program was broadcast on 27 December 2003.

On 14 October 1999, they made a major debut with single Free Magic composed by Makoto Miyoshi from Rumania Montevideo and written by Nana Azuki from Garnet Crow. The on-air version of this song was broadcast from 19 July. In media, it was used as an ending theme for popular Anime television series Detective Conan. On the weekly Oricon Charts it reached #33 rank and charted for 3 weeks.

In December 1999, they held a mini-live performance in Saison group Shibuya Club Quattro.

In February 2000, there were plans to release another mini album Ri-Ra (GZCA-1018) however due to unknown reason the release was canceled.

In October 2001, they released their first studio album WAG.

In December 2001, their single Kanashimi no Ame was included in Giza Studio's compilation album Giza Studio Masterpiece Blend 2001.

2002-2006
From September 2002 to March 2003, they held seven Friend Man-three Live events Whisky a Go go!  in Osaka Muse Hall.

On 21 December 2002, their single All For Your Love was included in Giza Studio's compilation album Giza Studio Masterpiece Blend 2002. This single was exclusively released for this album, and does not appear in any of their studio albums.

In July 2003, Wag held a live performance Hills Pan Koujou GIZA studio presents THURSDAY LIVE "ROCK NIGHT"  with guest Ami Matsunaga from The Tambourines and on October with indies band Elf.

In November 2003, they renewed and changed their website domain from giza.co.jp/wag into wag-net.com.

In December 2003, their single Fight Song was included in Giza Studio's compilation album Giza Studio Masterpiece Blend 2003.

In February 2004, their single Fukisusabu Kaze no Naka de appeared on the Oricon Weekly charts for the first time since 1999. The single was composed by Akihito Tokunaga and written by Yuka Saegusa from U-ka Saegusa in dB. In media it was used as an ending theme for Anime television series Saiyuki Reload.

In March 2004, Kousuke left the band.

In May 2005, the band released their final single Don't look back again. In media, it was used as an opening theme for Anime television series Saiyuki Reload Gunlock.

In November 2005, through official fanclub Wag-On they announced the. band's disbandment on 31 December 2006, a year after their official website was removed by Giza staff.

Discography

Indies singles

Singles

Studio albums

Indies albums

Magazine appearances
From Music Freak Magazine:

Vol.59 1999/October
Vol.60 1999/November
Vol.61 1999/December
Vol.62 2000/January
Vol.63 2000/February
Vol.64 2000/March
Vol.67 2000/June
Vol.68 2000/July
Vol.70 2000/September
Vol.73 2000/December
Vol.74 2001/January
Vol.78 2001/May
Vol.81 2001/August
Vol.82 2001/September
Vol.83 2001/October
Vol.84 2001/November
Vol.86 2002/January
Vol.87 2002/February
Vol.88 2002/March
Vol.89 2002/April
Vol.93 2002/August
Vol.94 2002/September
Vol.95 2002/October
Vol.96 2002/November
Vol.97 2002/December
Vol.98 2003/January
Vol.99 2003/February
Vol.100 2003/March
Vol.101 2003/April
Vol.102 2003/May
Vol.104 2003/July
Vol.105 2003/August
Vol.107 2003/October
Vol.108 2003/November
Vol.109 2003/December
Vol.110 2004/January
Vol.111 2004/February
Vol.113 2004/April
Vol.114 2004/May

From J-Rock Magazine:
1999/08
1999/09
1999/11
1999/12
2000/01
2000/03
2000/05
2000/06
2000/07
2000/08

From Digital Creators DGCR
Vol.5
Vol.10
Vol.13
Vol.15
Vol.16
Vol.19

From J-Groove Magazine:
November 2000 Vol.1
June 2001 Vol.8
September 2001 Vol.11
November 2001 Vol.13
April 2002 Vol.18
January 2003 Vol.27
February 2003 Vol.28
July 2003 Vol.33
September 2003 Vol.35

References

External links
Official website 
Renewed official website 
Official website by Being (in Japanese) 
Musing profile (in Japanese)
Oricon profile (in Japanese)()

Being Inc. artists
Japanese rock music groups
Anime musicians
Musical groups established in 1998
Musical groups disestablished in 2006
Year of birth missing (living people)